What My Heart Wants to Say is the debut album from the runner-up of the first series of Pop Idol, Gareth Gates. The album was released on 26 October 2002, almost a year after his success on the show. The album was produced by a team of well-known producers, including Steve Mac, Jewels & Stone, Mike Peden and Cathy Dennis. The album features a range of Gates' own material, as well as covers of some of his favourite songs.

Four singles were released from the album: "Unchained Melody", "Anyone of Us (Stupid Mistake)", "Suspicious Minds", and the title track, "What My Heart Wants to Say". In the UK, the album went on to achieve double platinum success, selling over 600,000 copies, and peaking at number 2 on the UK Albums Chart.

Background
Gates secured a record deal from Simon Cowell to his label, Sony BMG, after he became the runner-up to Will Young on the first series of talent competition Pop Idol in February 2002. Gates audition, a version of the popular Westlife track "Flying Without Wings", secured him entry into the show. Gates' first single, a cover of "Unchained Melody", entered the UK Singles Chart at number one. The single went double-platinum, and was voted 2002's The Record of the Year by viewers of ITV.

The track was followed by another number-one single, "Anyone of Us (Stupid Mistake)". His third single, a double A-side "Suspicious Minds" and "The Long and Winding Road", a duet with Young, also reached number one. His fourth single, the album's title track, "What My Heart Wants to Say", reached number five. The album achieved first week sales of over 100,000 copies, peaking at number two on the UK Albums Chart, and eventually earning double platinum status.

Track listing

Charts and certifications

Weekly charts

Year-end charts

Certifications

References

2002 debut albums
Gareth Gates albums
19 Recordings albums
Albums produced by Mike Peden